Neocaridina is a genus of atyid shrimp, containing 26 species as of March 2023.

References

External links

While this information is not currently available in English, Werner Klotz and Andreas Karge published it in the new (3rd) edition of “Süßwassergarnelen aus aller Welt”, Dähne Verlag, .

Atyidae
Decapod families